Chang is the pinyin romanization of the Chinese surname  (Cháng). It was listed 80th among the Song-era Hundred Family Surnames.

For full details on them, see the "Zhang"  and "Zheng"  article. In Macao, this is the spelling of the surname "Zeng" . "Chang" is also a common spelling of the surname / (Chen in Mandarin pinyin) in Peru.

Romanization
常 is romanized as Ch'ang in Wade-Giles, although the apostrophe is often omitted in practice. It is romanized as Soeng and Sheung in Cantonese; Seong and Siông in Minnan languages; and Sioh in Teochew. It is occasionally romanized Sōng and Thōng as well.

It is the source of the Vietnamese surname Thường and the Korean surname romanized as Sang. It is also another Romanization of the Korean surname Jang.

In Japanese, it is romanized as Jō.

Distribution
常 was unlisted among the most recent rankings of the 100 most common Chinese surnames in mainland China and on Taiwan based on household registrations in 2007, although the Ministry of Public Security in 2008 listed it as the 87th most common surname in China based on its database of National Identity Cards, shared by at least 2.4 million Chinese citizens.  It was the 94th-most-common surname during the 1982 Chinese census.

 is the third-most-common surname in mainland China, making up 6.83% of the population of the People's Republic of China, although there it is officially rendered into the Latin alphabet as Zhang. Its Traditional Chinese variant  is the fourth-most-common surname in Taiwan, making up 5.26% of the population of the Republic of China.

"Chang" is a common Chinese surname in the United States, ranked 687th among all surnames during the 1990 census and 424th during the year 2000 census. It was ranked 11th among all surnames held by Asians and Pacific Islanders and 6th among all surnames held by Chinese Americans in 2000, well ahead of the pinyin variant "Zhang".

"Chang" is a common surname in Peru, where it was adopted by Cantonese immigrants as a variant spelling of Chen (陈 or 陳).

Origin
The pronunciation of Chang in Old Chinese has been reconstructed as *daŋ. Its original meaning was "constant" or "often". By the time of Middle Chinese, the pronunciation had shifted to Dzyang.

Notable people with the surname Chang

 張 and 张
 Angela Chang (born 1982), Taiwanese singer and actress.
 Chang Cheh, Hong Kong film director
 Chang Chen-yue or "A-Yue", Taiwanese rock musician.
 Chang Ching-sen (born 1959), Governor of Fujian Province
 Chang Fei or "Fei Ge", Taiwanese television personality.
 Chang Jin-fu (born 1948), Governor of Taiwan Province (2009–2010)
 Chang King-yuh (born 1937), Minister of Mainland Affairs Council of the Republic of China (1996–1999)
 Chang Liang-jen (born 1946), Deputy Minister of National Defense of the Republic of China (2008–2009)
 Chang Li-shan (born 1964), Magistrate-elect of Yunlin County
 Chang San-cheng (born 1954), Premier of the Republic of China (2016)
 Chang Tzi-chin, Deputy Magistrate of Taipei County (2005–2006)
 Chen Chung Chang (1927–2014), mathematician
 Deserts Chang, Taiwanese singer/songwriter.
 Feiping Chang, Taiwanese-born Hong Kong socialite and fashion blogger
 Edmond E-min Chang (born 1970), Taiwanese American former lawyer and current federal district judge for northern Illinois, appointed by President Obama in 2010
 Eileen Chang (1920–1995), Chinese writer
 Erchen Chang, Taiwanese chef
 Eva Fong Chang (1897–1991), American artist
 Franklin Chang-Díaz (born 1950) a former NASA astronaut from Costa Rica.
 Chang Hui-mei or "A-mei", aboriginal Taiwanese singer and occasional songwriter.
 Iris Chang (1968–2004), American historian and journalist
 Jeff Chang, Taiwanese singer
 Jung Chang, Chinese writer and author of Wild Swans
 Chang Kai-chen (born 1991), Taiwanese tennis player
 Kathleen Chang, birth name of Kathy Change, a political activist who committed suicide by self-immolation at the University of Pennsylvania in 1996
 Katharine Chang, Chairperson of Straits Exchange Foundation
 Chang King Hai Chinese international footballer in 1948 Olympics
 Li Fung Chang, Taiwanese communications engineer
 Michael Te-Pei Chang (born 1972), Chinese American tennis player
 Peng Chun Chang (1892–1957), Chinese professor, philosopher, and playwright who played a pivotal role in drafting the Universal Declaration of Human Rights
 Phil Chang, Taiwanese singer-songwriter and television personality
 Shi-Kuo Chang, Taiwanese computer scientist and science fiction author
 Tseng Chang (1930–2021), Chinese American actor
 Victor Chang (1936–1991), Chinese Australian cardiac surgeon
 Chang Yu-sheng (1966–1997), Taiwanese singer, composer, and producer

 陳 and 陈
 José Antonio Chang, Peruvian politician.<ref name="HeSaiChen">Xinhua News Agency.  15 September 2010. Accessed 22 December 2016.</ref>
 常
 Chang Yuchun (1330–1369), a Ming general
 Elliott Charng, representative of the Republic of China to Australia
 章
 John Chiang, a Taiwanese politician formerly surnamed "Chang".
 Other/unknown
 Ivan Miranda Chang, Peruvian tennis player.
 Meiyang Chang, Chinese Indian television artist

 Fictional characters
 Chang, a henchman in the James Bond film Moonraker played by the Franco-Japanese aikido instructor Toshiro Suga
Kenny Chang, a character played by Robert Hoang in the British web series Corner Shop Show.
 Leia Chang, a character in the television show Degrassi: The Next Generation played by the Chinese Canadian actress Judy Jiao
 Mike Chang, a Chinese American character in the TV series Glee, played by Chinese Latin American actor Harry Shum Junior
 Michelle Chang, a part-Native-American, part-Chinese fighter in the video game franchise, Tekken.
 Julia Chang, Michelle Chang's adopted daughter, a Native-American fighter and ecologist in the video game franchise, Tekken.
 Tina Cohen-Chang, a Chinese American character in the TV series Glee, played by Korean-American actress Jenna Ushkowitz
Tony Chang, a character played by Michael Truong in the British web series Corner Shop Show.
 Chang Chong-Chen, a character in The Adventures of Tintin series, inspired by Hergé's real-life friend Zhang Chongren
 Ben Chang, a character in the TV series Community, played by actor Ken Jeong
  Manpukumaru Chang, a character from Valkyrie Drive- Bhikkhuni Corki Chang and her father Mr. Chang, characters from Make It Pop The Chang family (Sid, Adelaide, Becca, and Stanley), a group of characters who mainly appear in The Casagrandes''

See also
 Xu (surname)
 List of common Chinese surnames

References

Chinese-language surnames
Individual Chinese surnames